Albert Ferdinand Shore (September 4, 1876 – January 17, 1936) was an American metallurgist who invented the Shore durometer. He won the Elliott Cresson Medal.

Shore was born in New York City.

He invented the first quadrant durometer in 1915 to measure the hardness of polymers and other elastomers.

Shore died at Wickersham Hospital in Manhattan of a stroke. He was buried in Trinity Roman Catholic Cemetery in North Amityville, New York.

References

External links
Albert Ferdinand Shore patents
 Albert F. Shore patents

1876 births
1936 deaths
American metallurgists
Scientists from New York City
American inventors